22nd ADG Awards
January 27, 2018

Period Film:
The Shape of Water

Fantasy Film:
Blade Runner 2049

Contemporary Film:
Logan

The 22nd Art Directors Guild Excellence in Production Design Awards, took place on January 27, 2018 at the Hollywood & Highland Center Ray Dolby Ballroom in Hollywood, honoring the best production designers of 2017. Nominations were announced on January 4.

Winners and nominees

Film
 Period Film:
 Paul Denham Austerberry – The Shape of Water
 Sarah Greenwood – Darkest Hour
 Nathan Crowley – Dunkirk
 Jim Clay – Murder on the Orient Express
 Rick Carter – The Post

 Fantasy Film:
 Dennis Gassner – Blade Runner 2049
 Sarah Greenwood – Beauty and the Beast
 Rick Heinrichs – Star Wars: The Last Jedi
 James Chinlund – War for the Planet of the Apes
 Aline Bonetto – Wonder Woman

 Contemporary Film:
 François Audouy – Logan
 Stefania Cella – Downsizing
 Rusty Smith – Get Out
 Chris Jones – Lady Bird
 Inbal Weinberg – Three Billboards Outside Ebbing, Missouri

 Animated Film:
 Harley Jessup – Coco
 William Cone and Jay Shuster – Cars 3
 Olivier Adam – Despicable Me 3
 Grant Freckelton – The Lego Batman Movie
 Matthew Button – Loving Vincent

Television

 One-Hour Period or Fantasy Single-Camera Television Series:
 Deborah Riley – Game of Thrones (for "Dragonstone", "The Queen's Justice", "Eastwatch")
 Bo Welch – A Series of Unfortunate Events (for "The Bad Beginning: Part One", "The Reptile Room: Part One", "The Wide Window: Part One")
 Martin Childs – The Crown (for "A Company of Men", "Beryl", "Dear Mrs. Kennedy")
 Steve Arnold – Mindhunter (for "Episode 1", "Episode 4", "Episode 9")
 Chris Trujillo – Stranger Things (for "Chapter Six: The Spy", "Chapter Eight: The Mind Flayer", "Chapter Nine: The Gate")

 One-Hour Contemporary Single-Camera Television Series:
 Julie Berghoff – The Handmaid's Tale (for "Offred", "Birth Day", "Nolite Te Bastardes Carborundorum")
 Patti Podesta – American Gods (for "The Bone Orchard", "The Secret of Spoons", "Head Full of Snow")
 Andrew Stearn – The Handmaid's Tale (for "The Bridge")
 Anastasia White – Mr. Robot (for "eps3.0_power-saver-mode.h", "eps3.1_undo.gz", "eps3.2_legacy.so")
 Ruth De Jong – Twin Peaks (for "Part 1", "Part 8", "Part 15")

Half Hour Single-Camera Television Series:
 Todd Fjelsted – GLOW (for "Pilot", "The Wrath of Kuntar", "The Dusty Spur")
 Jessica Kender – Future Man (for "Pandora’s Mailbox", "Beyond the Truffledome", "A Date with Destiny")
 Amy Williams – Master of None (for "Le Nozze", "Thanksgiving", "Amarsi Un Po")
 Richard Toyon – Silicon Valley (for "Hooli-con", "Server Error")
 Jim Gloster – Veep (for "Omaha")

 Multi-Camera Series:
 Glenda Rovello – Will & Grace (for "11 Years Later", "A Gay Olde Christmas")
 Stephan Olson – 9JKL (for "Pilot", "Lovers Getaway", "Set Visit")
 John Shaffner – The Big Bang Theory (for "The Romance Recalibration", "The Separation Agitation", "The Explosion Implosion")
 John Shaffner – The Ranch (for "Last Dollar (Fly Away)", "Wrapped up in You")
 Stephan Olson – Superior Donuts (for "Pilot", "Crime Time", "Arthur’s Day Off")

Television Movie or Limited Series:
 Joel Collins – Black Mirror (for "USS Callister")
 Jeff Mossa – American Horror Story: Cult (for "Election Night", "Winter of Our Discontent")
 John Paino – Big Little Lies (for "Somebody's Dead", "Living the Dream", "You Get What You Need")
 Elisabeth Williams – Fargo (for "The Narrow Escape Problem", "The Law of Inevitability", "Who Rules the Land of Denial?")
 Judy Becker – Feud: Bette and Joan (for "Pilot", "And the Winner Is…", "You Mean All This Time We Could Have Been Friends?")

Variety or Competition Series/Awards or Event Special:
 Schuyler Telleen – Portlandia (for "Portland Secedes", "Ants", "Fred’s Cell Phone Company")
 Brian Stonestreet – 74th Golden Globe Awards
 James Pearse Connelly – Bill Nye Saves the World (for "Earth Is a Hot Mess")
 Keith Raywood, Eugene Lee, Akira Yoshimura and N. Joseph DeTullio – Saturday Night Live (for "Aziz Ansari/Big Sean", "Alec Baldwin/Ed Sheeran", "Larry David/Miley Cyrus")
 Bruce Rodgers – Super Bowl Halftime Show Starring Lady Gaga

Short Format: Web Series, Music Video or Commercial:
 Jason Edmonds – Star Wars Battlefront II: "Rivalry / PS4"
 James Chinlund – Apple: "Bulbs"
 Shane Valentino – Chanel: Gabrielle"
 Natalie Groce – Katy Perry: "Bon Appétit"
 Ruth De Jong – Nike: "Equality"

References

External links
 The winners and nominees on the official website

2017 film awards
2017 guild awards
Art Directors Guild Awards
2017 in American cinema